Noble Flaire (January 28, 1984 – July 28, 2006) was a Morgan horse sired by Noble Command.  He won multiple titles at the Grand National and World Championship Morgan Horse Show before he retired in 1991, and has produced many progeny.

Life History
Noble Flaire was bred by Bob Whitney and Judy Whitney of Cox's Creek, KY and foaled in 1984. He was sired by Noble Command and out of Lost River Sanfield.  In 1984, Herbert V. Kohler, Jr. of Kohler Stables bought Noble Flaire for a record price for a weanling at the time, and that was the last time he changed hands for the remainder of his life. He made his show ring debut as a yearling colt in 1985.  By the time he was two years old, he was already garnering attention. People would run to watch him perform, and throngs of people would follow him out of the ring after his victory pass just to see him trot.

By the time Noble Flaire retired from the show ring in 1991, he had won numerous World Championship titles including an unprecedented three Park Harness World Championships. This impressive horse died in 2006, but has left behind numerous progeny to carry on his name including the World Champions HVK Flaire Time, HVK Bell Flaire, Nostradamus, HVK Courageous Flaire, and HVK Vibrance, to name just a few.

Titles Won
The titles Noble Flaire has won include:

1991, 1989, 1988 World Champion Park Harness
1991 & 1989 World Champion Stallion
1991 & 1989 World Champion Senior Stallion
1991 & 1989 Grand National Five and Over Stallion
1986 World Champion Two-Year-Old Park Harness

Pedigree
                                                                        Starfire
  	  		  	  		  	  Waseeka's Nocturne 	 
  		  	  		  	  	  	  	Upwey Benn Quietude
  		  	  		  Waseeka's In Command 	  	 
  	  		  	  		  	  	  	Upwey Ben Don
  	  		  	  		  	  Miller's Adel 	 
  	  	  		  	  		  	  	Gertie G
                        Noble Command 	  	  	 
  	  	  		  	  		  	  	Starfire
  	  		  	  		  	  Waseeka's Nocturne 	 
  	  	  	  	  		  	  		Upwey Benn Quietude
  		  	  		  Waseeka's Interlude 	  	 
  	  	  		  	  		  	  	Parade
  	  		  	  		  	  Waseeka's Thisizit 	 
  	 	  		  	    		  	  	Upwey Benn Quietude
  	  Noble Flaire	  	 
  	  	  		  	  		  	  	Springbrook Mansfield
  	  		  	  		  	  Jody's Ace Of Spades
  	  	  		  	  		  	  	Jody Jean O
  		  	  		  John Wayne Brady 	  	 
  	  	  		  	  		  	  	Payday
  	  		  	  		  	  Miranda Brady
  	  	  		  	  		  	  	Lizza's Black Beauty
                        Lost River Sanfield 	  	  	 
  	  	  		  	  		  	  	Capitan Fillmore
  	  		  	  		  	  Devan Jason
  	  	  		  	  		  	  	Ladycap
  		  	  		  Jason's Winett 	  	 
  	  	  		  	  		  	  	Roubidoux
  	  		  	  		  	  Roubikate 	 
  	  	  		  	  		  	  	Kitty Hawk

See also
Kohler Stables
List of historical horses

References

 

Kohler Company
Individual Morgan horses
1984 animal births
2006 animal deaths